A band formed by Alan Gregg after leaving The Mutton Birds which is based in London, England.  Members: Alan Gregg, Bert Thomas, Richard Turner and Cy Winstanley. David Long, Bic Runga and Ron Sexsmith contributed to the album Marshmallow.

Discography
 Klangsystem - CD album (1996)
 re bound - CD album (1998)
 Swat - CD album (2000)
 Marshmallow - CD album (2003) (reissued 2005 with two extra songs)
 Anytime Soon - CD single (2004)

External links 
 Marshmallow home page - No longer in use
 Marshmallow at Myspace.com
 A Religion Of A Kind - The Mutton Birds and beyond

References 

Musical groups from London
Musical quartets